Christopher Blom Paus (8 October 1810  – 28 October 1898) was a Norwegian shipowner, merchant and banker.

Biography
Paus was born at the estate Rising Nordre in  Gjerpen, Norway.
Born into the patriciate of the port town of Skien, he was the son of shipowner Ole Paus and Johanne Plesner (formerly married Ibsen). He was the uncle of playwright Henrik Ibsen, as he was both the half brother of Ibsen's father Knud Ibsen and the first cousin of Ibsen's mother Marichen Altenburg. He was the brother of judge, Bratsberg governor and Member of Parliament Christian Cornelius Paus and lawyer Henrik Johan Paus. Christopher Blom Paus owned the house at Snipetorp where the Ibsen family lived from the time of  Henrik Ibsen's confirmation in 1843 to 1865.

Paus started as a wholesaler and eventually concentrated mainly on shipping business.
He entered his business career as a clerk in his brother's  trading shop.
Paus worked from the late 1820s until 1836 for merchant Christopher Hansen Blom in the Blom trading house.
In the 1860s he invested heavily in shipping and entered the emigrant trade with runs between Trondheim, Québec and Newcastle.
He later became one of Skien's leading shipowner and one of the  leader businessman.
He was a city councilor in Skien for several years and held other public offices. In addition to being a ship-owner, he was administrative director of the savings bank, Skiens Sparebank 1874–1887. He was a member of the city council in Skien for several years and held a number of other public positions.

Personal life
Christopher Blom Paus was married in 1845  to Erasmine Ernst (1817–1914)
He was the father of factory owner Ole Paus. His grandson Herman Paus married Countess Tatyana Tolstoy, a granddaughter of Leo Tolstoy. Their descendants own Herresta and other Swedish estates. He was also the great-grandfather of General Ole Paus and the great-great-grandfather of singer Ole Paus. Christopher Blom Paus died at Oslo and was buried at Vår Frelsers gravlund.

References

Other sources
 Arvid Høgvoll; Ruth Bærland (1996)  Henrik Ibsen: Herregårder, kammerherrer, godseiere og proprietærer: brokker av en slektshistorie (Nome antikvariat)  

1810 births
1898 deaths
People from Telemark
People from Skien
Norwegian merchants
Norwegian businesspeople in shipping
Norwegian bankers
Christopher Blom
Burials at the Cemetery of Our Saviour